Presidencia Municipal de Puerto Vallarta is a government building in Centro, Puerto Vallarta, in the Mexican state of Jalisco.

The interior features a mural by Manuel Lepe Macedo called Puerto Vallarta.

References

External links 

 

Centro, Puerto Vallarta
Government buildings in Mexico